Maldives elects on national level a head of state, the president,  and a legislature. The president is elected directly for a five-year term by the people.

The Assembly (Majlis) has 88 members . All members are elected directly for a term of five years from 88 single-member constituencies.

Latest elections

2019 parliamentary election

2018 presidential election

See also 
 Electoral calendar
 Electoral system

References

External links
Adam Carr's Election Archive